Eleanor of Aragon (2 May 1402 – 19 February 1445) was Queen of Portugal from 1433 to 1438 as the spouse of King Edward. After Edward's death, she served as regent for her son Afonso V. She was the daughter of Ferdinand I of Aragon and Eleanor of Alburquerque.

Biography 
Eleanor's father died when she was 14 years old. Her mother eventually arranged her marriage to the future King Edward of Portugal, which happened on 22 September 1428. They had nine children, of whom five survived to adulthood. None of them lived past age 50. In 1433, she became Queen of Portugal on the same day her eldest child died. As queen she was not active politically and quickly became unpopular.

When her husband died on 9 September 1438, she was appointed regent of Portugal in his will, which was confirmed by the Portuguese Cortes. However, she was inexperienced, in poor health and, as an Aragonese, unpopular with the people, who preferred the late king's brother Infante Peter, Duke of Coimbra. The confirmation of her regency therefore caused a riot in Lisbon. The riot was suppressed by her brother Count John of Barcelona, later King John II of Aragon. Eleanor was supported by the nobility and the will, while Peter was supported by a fraction of the nobility and by the people. Negotiations for a compromise arrangement were drawn out over several months, but were complicated by the interference of the Count of Barcelos, who supported her, and the Archbishop of Lisbon, who supported Peter. This period also witnessed the birth to her of a posthumous daughter, Joan in March 1439 and the death of her eldest daughter, Philippa from tuberculosis.

Eventually, the Cortes appointed Peter the sole regent. Eleanor continued conspiring, but fell seriously ill and was forced to go into exile in Castile in December 1440. She died at Toledo after a prolonged respiratory illness in February 1445 and is buried in Batalha, Portugal.

Issue
Eleanor had a total of nine children, five of whom survived to adulthood.
Infante John, October 1429 – 14 August 1433.
Infanta Philippa 27 November 1430 – 24 March 1439.
Afonso V of Portugal 15 January 1432 – 28 August 1481; who succeeded Edward as 12th King of Portugal.
Infanta Maria, 7 December 1432 – 8 December 1432.
Infante Ferdinand, 17 November 1433 – 18 September 1470; Duke of Viseu and father of future king Manuel I of Portugal.
Eleanor, 18 September 1434 – 3 September 1467; married Frederick III, Holy Roman Emperor.
Infante Edward, 12 July 1435 – 12 July 1435.
Catherine, 26 November 1436 – 17 June 1463.
Joan, 31 March 1439 – 13 June 1475; married King Henry IV of Castile.

Ancestry

References

Citations

Sources
 

|-

1402 births
1445 deaths
House of Trastámara
House of Aviz
Portuguese queens consort
15th-century Portuguese women
15th-century Portuguese people
15th-century women rulers
Eleanor of Aragon, Queen of Portugal
Daughters of kings
Queen mothers